Reyvumun is a 2018 Maldivian horror film directed by Amjad Ibrahim. The film stars Mohamed Manik and Najiha, and was released on 24 March 2018.

Cast 
 Mohamed Manik as Yanish
 Najihaa Azoor as Shaheen
 Fauziyya Hassan as Hareera
 Ahmed Shaaz as Zufar
 Mariyam Shakeela as Shahida
 Hassan Manik as Bushree
 Nashidha Ali

Development
Reyvumun is directed by Amjad Ibrahim, marking his fifty-second direction of a feature film. After the film Hithey Dheymee (2011), Ibrahim took a break of eight years before returning to the work of film direction.

Soundtrack

References

External links
 

2018 films
2018 horror films
Maldivian horror films
Films directed by Amjad Ibrahim